The Jaisalmer Formation is a Middle to Late Jurassic-aged geologic formation located in India near the city of Jaisalmer that consists mainly of marine deposits. The formation was first identified and defined by geologist Richard Dixon Oldham in 1886.

Dinosaur remains are among the known fossils recovered from this formation.

Sub-units 
The Badabag, Fort, Joyan and Hamira members represent the Middle Jurassic Bajocian and Bathonian stages, while the Jajiya and Kuldhar members represent the Middle Jurassic Callovian and the Late Jurassic Oxfordian stages.

The Fort Member is the most extensively studied and consists of fine to medium grain sandstones and oolitic limestones. The Badabag Member consists of intraformational conglomerate and is fossil bearing.

Paleofauna 

 (?)Bichordites sp. – "Ichnofossils"
 Planolites .sp – "Ichnofossils"
 Rhizocorallium irregulare – "Ichnofossils"
 Rhizocorallium jenense – "Ichnofossils"
 Taenidium serpentinum – "Ichnofossils"
 Thalassinoides .sp – "Ichnofossils"
 aff. Turiasauria indet. – "Fragmentary tooth"
 Averostra indet. - isolated tooth
 Strophodus jaisalmerensis
 Strophodus indicus

References 

Geologic groups of Asia
Geologic formations of India
Oxfordian Stage
Callovian Stage
Bathonian Stage
Bajocian Stage
Paleontology in India